Jeff Burrell is an American-born actor and voice-over artist based in Germany. He has worked under Roman Polanski and Lars von Trier.

Early years
Burrell was born in Staten Island, New York, in 1968. He studied acting at the High School of Performing Arts in New York City. He then got a BA in German Studies at Oberlin College in 1990. After that he was awarded a Fulbright scholarship to study acting at the Hochschule für Schauspielkunst Ernst Busch in Berlin, Germany. He got a degree in 1994, with which he was the first American to do so.

Career

Burrell began his professional career at the Neues Theater [de] in Halle (Saale). He was in the acting ensemble until 2000, when he moved to Berlin.

Among other movies, Burrell acted in Roman Polanski's The Ghost Writer (2010), and Lars von Trier's Nymphomaniac (2013). He was in the spy thriller Jack Strong by Władysław Pasikowski, and was a narrator in the documentary Warsaw Uprising by Jan Komasa.

He acted in Oles Sanin's film The Guide, which was Ukraine's 2014 nomination to the Academy Awards. His acting partner was the singer Jamala, who would later go on to win the Eurovision Song Contest 2016.

Burrell won a "Best Actor Award" for his performance in the film Robin: Watch for Wishes at the Festival South Film Expo 2018.

In the fall of 2018 Burrell performed the role of Fred Madison in Yuval Sharon's production of Lost Highway at the Oper Frankfurt.

Filmography

Film

Television

References

Living people
1968 births
American male voice actors
American expatriates in Germany